Clube Atlético Lençoense/Bariri, commonly known as CAL/Bariri, is a currently inactive Brazilian football club based in Bariri, São Paulo state. The club was formerly known as Clube Atlético Lençoense.

History
The club was founded on December 12, 1943, as Clube Atlético Lençoense, in Lençois Paulista. They won the Campeonato Paulista Série A3 in 1983. It was renamed to Clube Atlético Lençoense/Bariri in 2009, after moving to Bariri due to political problems with the city hall of Lençóis Paulista.

Achievements

 Campeonato Paulista Série A3:
 Winners (1): 1983

Stadium
Clube Atlético Lençoense/Bariri play their home games at Estádio Municipal Farid José Resegue. The stadium has a maximum capacity of 2,144 people.

During the time when the club was based in Lençóis Paulista, they played at Estádio Municipal Archangelo Brega, which as a maximum capacity of 5,242 people.

References

Inactive football clubs in Brazil
Association football clubs established in 1943
Football clubs in São Paulo (state)
1943 establishments in Brazil